Pfaffenthal is a quarter in central Luxembourg City, in southern Luxembourg. The quarter owes its name to the German words Pfaffen, meaning monk, and Tal, meaning valley, as the area was once administered by the Benedictine Abbey in Altmunster. During the Middle Ages, this site was popular with craftsmen and artisans, who used the Alzette River to aid in their work. The site is a strategically important gateway to Luxembourg City, and was thus repeatedly fortified by successive rulers from about the fourteenth to eighteenth centuries.

, the quarter has a population of 1,284 inhabitants, with 39.80% being of Luxembourgish nationality.

References

Quarters of Luxembourg City
Alzette